Harpalus subaeneus is a species of ground beetle in the subfamily Harpalinae. It was described by Boheman in 1848.

References

subaeneus
Beetles described in 1848